Oued El Alenda is a town and commune in Mih Ouensa District, El Oued Province, Algeria. According to the 2008 census it has a population of 6,830, up from 5,839 in 1998, with an annual growth rate of 1.6%.

Climate

Oued El Alenda has a hot desert climate (Köppen climate classification BWh), with very hot summers and mild winters. Rainfall is light and sporadic, and summers are particularly dry.

Education

4.3% of the population has a tertiary education, and another 13.0% has completed secondary education. The overall literacy rate is 75.5%, and is 83.2% among males and 67.2% among females.

Localities
The commune of Oued El Alenda is composed of seven localities:

Oued El Alenda Sud
Oued El Alenda Nord
Chégamat
Mih El Ghazala
Dabadib
Khobna
Safra

References

Neighbouring towns and cities

Communes of El Oued Province